The Algerian National Front is a right-wing political party in Algeria. The leader of the party is Moussa Touati.

In the elections of 30 May 2002, the party won 1.6% of the popular vote and eight of 380 seats. In the 2007 elections, it won 4.18% of the vote and 13 seats.

Electoral history

Presidential elections

People's National Assembly elections

References

1990s establishments in Algeria
Conservative parties in Algeria
Nationalist parties in Algeria
Political parties established in 1990
Political parties in Algeria